Greifswald Medical School is a division of the University of Greifswald, Germany, consisting of the university's medical school and the adjacent Greifswald University Hospital. Its roots date back to the founding of the university in the year 1456, and it is therefore one of the oldest such institutions in Europe.

Institution
The medical school has existed since the founding of the university in 1456, and is therewith one of the oldest medical schools in the world still in existence.

Admission
The University of Greifswald's medical school is the second most requested, the most selective, and among the best-ranked in Germany. In 2007, Greifswald was ranked 2nd of 34 medical schools in Germany in terms of popularity with prospective students, out-ranking other popular universities such as the University of Heidelberg. Degrees are offered in medicine as well as dentistry. In Germany, places to study medicine and dentistry are usually allocated (by high school results) on a national level by a country-wide agency. However, a certain fraction of the places available may be administered by the universities if they wish so. In the year 2008, there were 2,100 applications for 95 places for medicine in Greifswald, which equals an admission rate of only 4.52 percent. In the same year, there were 400 applicants for 29 places in dentistry, which equals an admission rate of 7.25 percent. Admission is therefore as restrictive as at some of the world's best medical schools like Harvard.

Programmes
 Medicine
 Dentistry
Biomedical Science (B. Sc.)
Clinical Nursing Science (B. Sc.)

Greifswald University Hospital
The university hospital (German: Universitätsmedizin Greifswald), was completely reconstructed at the new science campus east of the city centre up to the year 2011. It is therefore one of the best equipped and most up-to-date full service hospital in Germany. The university hospital recently purchased a nearby communal hospital in the city of Wolgast to increase the number of beds and treated patients. This was the first time in Germany, that a (public) university hospital bought another public hospital. The merger was first prohibited because German antitrust authorities were worried about a dominating position of the Universitätsklinikum Greifswald in the region. However, the decision was later revoked by a direct veto of the federal government of Germany, which is a very rare procedure.

Notable people
 Ferdinand Sauerbruch

References

External links
 The University of Greifswald Medical School
 Greifswald University Hospital

Medical School
1450s establishments in the Holy Roman Empire
1456 establishments in Europe
Medical research institutes in Germany
Medical schools in Germany